MiG-29 may refer to
Mikoyan MiG-29, a Soviet-Russian fighter aircraft
Mig 29 Soviet Fighter, 1989 game by Codemasters
MiG-29 Fulcrum (1990 video game), 1990 combat flight simulation by Domark
MiG-29 Fulcrum (1998 video game), 1998 combat flight simulation by Novalogic